Paul Thatcher may refer to:

Paul Thatcher, candidate in Portsmouth Council election, 2003
Paul Thatcher, character in The Adventures of Frank and Jesse James